Torilis is a genus of plants in the family Apiaceae which are known generally as the hedge parsleys. They are native to Eurasia and North Africa but have been introduced to other continents. T. arvensis is quite widespread in North America but is facing population decline in the UK.

Selected species:
Torilis arvensis - spreading hedge parsley, Canadian hedge parsley, common hedge parsley
Torilis japonica - Japanese hedge parsley
Torilis leptophylla - bristlefruit hedge parsley
Torilis nodosa - knotted hedge parsley
Torilis scabra - rough hedge parsley

References

External links
 GRIN species list
 

Apioideae
Apioideae genera